Morpheis xylotribus is a moth in the family Cossidae. It was described by Gottlieb August Wilhelm Herrich-Schäffer in 1853. It is found in Brazil.

References

Zeuzerinae
Moths described in 1853